Heinz-Horst Hißbach (30 January 1916 – 14 April 1945) was a Luftwaffe night fighter ace and recipient of the Knight's Cross of the Iron Cross during World War II. The Knight's Cross of the Iron Cross was awarded to recognise extreme battlefield bravery or successful military leadership.  Heinz-Horst Hißbach claimed 34 aerial victories, all of them at night.

Career
Hißbach was born on 30 January 1916 in Dessau.

Night fighter career

Following the 1939 aerial Battle of the Heligoland Bight, RAF attacks shifted to the cover of darkness, initiating the Defence of the Reich campaign. By mid-1940, Generalmajor (Brigadier General) Josef Kammhuber had established a night air defense system dubbed the Kammhuber Line. It consisted of a series of control sectors equipped with radars and searchlights and an associated night fighter. Each sector named a Himmelbett (canopy bed) would direct the night fighter into visual range with target bombers. In 1941, the Luftwaffe started equipping night fighters with airborne radar such as the Lichtenstein radar. This airborne radar did not come into general use until early 1942.

On 1 November 1944, Hißbach succeeded Major Paul Semrau as Gruppenkommandeur of II. Gruppe of Nachtjagdgeschwader 2 (NJG 2—2nd Night Fighter Wing).

In the night of 14/15 April 1945, Hißbach and his crew of Hubert Varzecha and Max Mayer were killed in action when they were shot down by anti-aircraft artillery. The three were strafing a US resupply column, destroying eight vehicles, in the area of Gelnhausen when their aircraft was hit and exploded. Posthumously, he was awarded the Knight's Cross of the Iron Cross that day.

Summary of career

Aerial victory claims
According Spick, Hißbach was credited with 34 nocturnal aerial victories, claimed in approximately 200 combat missions. Foreman, Parry and Mathews, authors of Luftwaffe Night Fighter Claims 1939 – 1945, researched the German Federal Archives and found records for 30 victory claims. Mathews and Foreman also published Luftwaffe Aces — Biographies and Victory Claims, stating that Hißbach claimed more than 29 aerial victories, plus two further unconfirmed claims.

Victory claims were logged to a map-reference (PQ = Planquadrat), for example "PQ DF-DG". These sectors were then subdivided into 36 smaller units to give a location area 3 × 4 km in size.

Awards
 Flugzeugführerabzeichen
 Front Flying Clasp of the Luftwaffe
 Iron Cross (1939) 2nd and 1st Class
 Honour Goblet of the Luftwaffe (Ehrenpokal der Luftwaffe) on 19 June 1944 as Hauptmann and pilot
 German Cross in Gold on 1 January 1945 as Hauptmann in the 5./Nachtjagdgeschwader 2
 Knight's Cross of the Iron Cross on 15 April 1945 as Hauptmann and Gruppenkommandeur of the II./Nachtjagdgeschwader 2

Notes

References

Citations

Bibliography

 
 
 
 
 
 
 
 
 
 
 

1916 births
1945 deaths
People from Dessau-Roßlau
Luftwaffe pilots
German World War II flying aces
Luftwaffe personnel killed in World War II
Recipients of the Gold German Cross
Recipients of the Knight's Cross of the Iron Cross
People from the Duchy of Anhalt
Military personnel from Saxony-Anhalt
Aviators killed by being shot down